is a Japanese footballer who plays for Gil Vicente of the Primeira Liga.

Career
After being raised on Tokyo Verdy youth ranks, Fujimoto was promoted to the top team in October 2017. He debuted in a J2 League game in the opening match of the 2018 season against JEF United Chiba. In May 2020, Portuguese newspaper A Bola reported advanced talks for a move to Gil Vicente for the 2020-21 season, in a one-year loan with an option to buy his contract. The move was confirmed on 5 August 2020,as he signed for the Portuguese club on loan with an option for them to buy out his contract.

Club statistics
Updated to 15 March 2023.

References

External links

Profile at J. League
Profile at Tokyo Verdy

1999 births
Living people
Association football people from Yamanashi Prefecture
Japanese footballers
Association football midfielders
Tokyo Verdy players
Gil Vicente F.C. players
J2 League players
Primeira Liga players
Japanese expatriate footballers
Expatriate footballers in Portugal
Japanese expatriate sportspeople in Portugal
Japan under-20 international footballers